The 1994 United Nations Security Council election was held on 20 October 1994 during the Forty-ninth session of the United Nations General Assembly, held at United Nations Headquarters in New York City. The General Assembly elected Botswana, Germany, Honduras, Indonesia, and Italy, as the five new non-permanent members of the UN Security Council for two-year mandates commencing on 1 January 1995. Both Botswana and Honduras were elected for the first time, whereas Germany was elected for the first time since German reunification.

Rules
The Security Council has 15 seats, filled by five permanent members and ten non-permanent members. Each year, half of the non-permanent members are elected for two-year terms. A sitting member may not immediately run for re-election.

In accordance with the rules whereby the ten non-permanent UNSC seats rotate among the various regional blocs into which UN member states traditionally divide themselves for voting and representation purposes, the five available seats are allocated as follows:

One for African countries (held by Djibouti)
One for countries from the Asian Group (now the Asia-Pacific Group) (held by Pakistan)
One for Latin America and the Caribbean (held by Brazil)
Two for the Western European and Others Group (held by New Zealand and Spain)

To be elected, a candidate must receive a two-thirds majority of those present and voting. If the vote is inconclusive after the first round, three rounds of restricted voting shall take place, followed by three rounds of unrestricted voting, and so on, until a result has been obtained. In restricted voting, only official candidates may be voted on, while in unrestricted voting, any member of the given regional group, with the exception of current Council members, may be voted on.

Endorsed candidates
The Chairpersons of the respective Regional Groups made known their endorsements of the candidate nations prior to the vote. Mr. Jallow of the Gambia gave the endorsement of the African Group to Botswana. Mr. Slade of Samoa gave the endorsement of the Asian Group to Indonesia. Mr. Fernandez Estigarribia of Paraguay gave the endorsement of the Latin American and Caribbean Group to Honduras. Mrs. Fréchette, the then-Permanent Representative of Canada to the United Nations, gave the endorsement of the Western European and Others Group to Germany and Italy.

Result
170 ballot papers were distributed for all voting.

African Group

Latin American and Caribbean Group

Western European and Other Group

See also
List of members of the United Nations Security Council
Germany and the United Nations
Indonesia and the United Nations
European Union and the United Nations

References

External links
UN Document A/49/PV.40 Official record of General Assembly meeting, 20 October 1994

1994 elections
1994
Non-partisan elections
1994 in international relations